Natalie von Bertouch (born 16 December 1982), also known as Natalie Bode, is a former Australia netball international. Between 2004 and 2012 she made 76 senior appearances for Australia. Bertouch was a member of the Australia teams that won the gold medals at the 2007 and 2011 World Netball Championships. She captained Australia at the latter tournament. She was also a member of the Australia teams that won the silver medals at the 2006 and 2010 Commonwealth Games. At club level, Bertouch captained Adelaide Thunderbirds to two ANZ Championship titles in 2010 and 2013. Her older sister, Laura von Bertouch is also a former  netball player. The two sisters were team mates with both Thunderbirds and Australia.

Early life, family and education
Bertouch is the daughter of Terry von Bertouch who during the late 1960s and 1970s played Australian rules football for North Adelaide and Norwood in the South Australian National Football League. Her older sister, Laura von Bertouch, is also a former Australia netball international. The Bertouch sisters were both educated at Immanuel College. Between 2004 and 2008, Bertouch attended Flinders University where she gained a Bachelor's degree in Dietetics and Clinical Nutrition Services. In November 2014 she married the Australian rules footballer, Jace Bode. They have two daughters.

Playing career

Contax
Bertouch and her sister, Laura von Bertouch, began playing netball aged seven and nine at the Contax Netball Club. In 2000, together with Tracey Neville, the Bertouch sisters were members of the Contax team that won the South Australia state league. Natalie also helped Contax win further state leagues title in 2002 and 2003.

AIS
During the 2001 season, Bertouch played for the Australian Institute of Sport. She was a member of the AIS team that won the South Australia state league. She was also named the league's best and fairest player and was selected in the Team of the Year.

Adelaide Thunderbirds
Between 2001 and 2013, Bertouch played for Adelaide Thunderbirds. During the Commonwealth Bank Trophy era she was named in the Team of the Year for three successive seasons between 2005 and 2007. In 2008, Bertouch became the inaugural ANZ Championship Thunderbirds captain. She subsequently captained Thunderbirds to two ANZ Championship titles. In 2010, after finishing second during the regular season, they defeated the minor premiers, New South Wales Swifts, in the major semi-final and Waikato Bay of Plenty Magic in the grand final.
In 2013, Natalie von Bertouch captained Thunderbirds to a second premiership after they defeated Queensland Firebirds in the grand final. Shortly after the 2013 grand final Bertouch announced she was retiring as a player.

Australia
Between 2004 and 2012 Bertouch made 76 senior appearances for Australia. Bertouch was a member of the Australia team that won the gold medal at the 2007 World Netball Championships. She was also a member of the Australia teams that won the silver medals at the 2006 and 2010 Commonwealth Games. 
Bertouch captained Australia for the first time in 2008, in the absence of regular captain Sharelle McMahon. She subsequently captained Australia when they won the gold medal at the 2011 World Netball Championships.

Employment
Since retiring as a netball player, Bertouch has been involved in various projects. Since 2015 she has worked for Cancer Council SA. In 2016 and 2017 she worked as a columnist for The Advertiser. In 2015 and 2016 she served as a Netball South Australia board member. In 2018 she joined the Adelaide Thunderbirds coaching staff as a mid-court specialist coach.

Honours

Australia
World Netball Championships
Winners: 2007, 2011
Commonwealth Games
Runners Up: 2006, 2010
Adelaide Thunderbirds
ANZ Championship
Winners: 2010, 2013
Runners Up: 2009
Australian Institute of Sport
South Australia State League
Winners: 2001
Contax
South Australia State League
Winners: 2000, 2002, 2003

References

1982 births
Living people
Australian netball players
Australia international netball players
Australia international Fast5 players
Netball players from South Australia
Contax Netball Club players
Adelaide Thunderbirds players
ANZ Championship players
Commonwealth Bank Trophy players
Australian Institute of Sport netball players
Commonwealth Games medallists in netball
Commonwealth Games silver medallists for Australia
Netball players at the 2006 Commonwealth Games
Netball players at the 2010 Commonwealth Games
Australian people of German descent
Adelaide Thunderbirds coaches
Australian netball coaches
Australian netball administrators
Sportspeople from Adelaide
Flinders University alumni
People educated at Immanuel College, Adelaide
South Australian Sports Institute netball players
South Australia state netball league players
2007 World Netball Championships players
2011 World Netball Championships players
Medallists at the 2006 Commonwealth Games
Medallists at the 2010 Commonwealth Games